Katič and Sveta Neđelja are two small islets on the Adriatic Sea, located opposite of the town of Petrovac in the Montenegrin municipality of Budva.

The Sveta Neđelja islet has a small church of the same name built upon it, and coupled with the Katič islet, makes an attraction for diving enthusiasts.

See also
Vlada Katic (born 1989), Israeli-Uzbekistani tennis player

References

Budva
Uninhabited islands of Montenegro
Islands of the Adriatic Sea